Leucopogon cordifolius, commonly known as heart-leaved beard-heath, is a species of flowering plant in the heath family Ericaceae and is endemic to Australia. It is an erect shrub with broadly egg-shaped to round leaves, and white, tube-shaped flowers, the petals bearded on the inside.

Description

Taxonomy
Leucopogon cordifolius was first formally described in 1838 by John Lindley in Thomas Mitchell's journal, Three Expeditions into the interior of Eastern Australia. The specific epithet (cordifolius) means "heart-leaved".

The National Herbarium of Victoria and Western Australian Herbarium give the name Styphelia cordifolia.

Distribution and habitat
Heart-leaved beard-heath grows in the understorey of woodland and in heathland in the far north-west of Victoria, the south-east of South Australia, and disjunctly in the Carnarvon, Geraldton Sandplains, Yalgoo bioregions in the west of Western Australia.

References

cordifolius
Ericales of Australia
Flora of Victoria (Australia)
Flora of South Australia
Flora of Western Australia
Plants described in 1838
Taxa named by John Lindley